This is a list of common affixes used when scientifically naming species, particularly extinct species for whom only their scientific names are used, along with their derivations.

a-, an-: Pronunciation: /ə/, /a/, /ən/, /an/. Origin:  (a, an-). Meaning: a prefix used to make words with a sense opposite to that of the root word; in this case, meaning "without" or "-less". This is usually used to describe organisms without a certain characteristic, as well as organisms in which that characteristic may not be immediately obvious.
Examples: Anurognathus ("tail-less jaw"); Apus ("without foot"); Apteryx ("wingless"); Pteranodon ("toothless wing")
-acanth, acantho-, -cantho: Pronunciation: /eɪkænθ/, /eɪkænθoʊ/. Origin:  (ákantha). Meaning: spine.
Examples: Acanthodes ("spiny base"); Acanthostega ("spine roof"); coelacanth ("hollow spine"); Acrocanthosaurus ("high-spined lizard"); Acanthoderes ("spiny neck"); Acanthamoeba ("spiny amoeba")
 aeto-: Pronunciation: /aɛto/. Origin:  (aetós). Meaning: eagle.
Examples: Aetonyx ("eagle claw"); Aetobatus ("eagle ray"); Aetosaur ("eagle lizard")
amphi-: Pronunciation: /amfiː/, /amfɪ/. Origin:  (amphí). Meaning: both.
Examples: Amphibia ("two types of life"); Amphicoelias ("hollow at both ends"); Amphicyon ("ambiguous dog")
-anthus, antho-: Pronunciation: /anθəs/, /anθoʊ/. Origin:  (ánthos). Meaning: flower.
Examples: Helianthus ("sunflower"); Anthophila ("flower-loving"); Dianthus ("Zeus flower"/"godly flower")
arch-, archi-, archo-, -archus: Pronunciation: /ark/, /arkoʊ/, /arkɪ/, /arkəs/. Origin:  (arkhós), meaning: ruler; ἀρχικός (arkhikós), meaning: ruling. Used for exceptionally large or widespread animals.
Examples: Archelon ("ruling turtle"); Architeuthis ("ruling squid"); Thalattoarchon ("Sea Ruler"); Archosaur ("ruling lizard"); Andrewsarchus ("Andrews's ruler")
archaeo-: Pronunciation: /arkiːɒ/, /arkiːoʊ/ . Origin:  (arkhaîos). Meaning: ancient. Used for early versions of animals and plants.
Examples: Archaeopteryx ("ancient wing"); Archaeoindris ("ancient Indri"); Archaeopteris ("ancient fern"); Archaeanthus ("ancient flower")
-arctos, arcto-: Pronunciation: /arktoʊz/, /arktoʊ/. Origin:  (árktos). Meaning: bear.
Examples: Phascolarctos ("bag  bear"); Arctodus ("bear tooth"); Arctocyon ("bear dog")
arthro-: /arθroʊ/. Origin:  (árthron). Meaning: joint. Often used for animals with exoskeletons.
Examples: Arthrospira ("jointed coil"); Arthropleura ("jointed rib"); arthropod ("jointed foot")
aspido-, -aspis: Pronunciation: /əspɪdoʊ/, /əspɪs/. Origin:  (aspís). Meaning: shield. The suffix "-aspis" is used to describe armored fish.
Examples: Aspidochelone ("shield turtle"); Cephalaspis ("head shield"); Sacabambaspis ("Sacabamba shield"); Brindabellaspis ("Brindabella shield")
-avis: Pronunciation: /əvɪs/. Origin: . Meaning: bird.
Examples: Protoavis ("first bird"); Argentavis ("Argentine bird"); Eoalulavis ("little-winged dawn bird")
-bates: Pronunciation: /bætiz/. Origin:  ("baínō"). Meaning: wanderer, one that treads.
Examples: Hylobates ("forest wanderer"); Dendrobates ("tree wanderer")
brachi-, brachy-: pronunciation: /brækɪ/. Origin:  (brakhús, brakhíōn). Meaning: short, and the short part of the arm, or upper arm, respectively. Used in its original meaning, and also to mean "arm".
Examples: Brachylophosaurus ("short-crested lizard"); Brachiosaurus ("arm lizard"); Brachyceratops ("short-horned face")
bronto-: Pronunciation: /brɒntoʊ/. Origin:  (brontḗ). Meaning: thunder. Used for large animals.
Examples: Brontosaurus ("thunder lizard"), Brontotherium ("thunder beast"), Brontoscorpio ("thunder scorpion") Brontochelys ("thunder turtle")
-canth, cantho-: see -acanth, acantho-.
carcharo-: Pronunciation: /kərkæro/. Origin:  (kárkharos). Meaning: sharp, jagged; extended via  (karkharías) to mean "shark".
Examples: Carcharodon ("jagged tooth"), Carcharocles ("glorious shark"), Carcharodontosaurus ("serrated tooth lizard")
-cephalus, cephalo-, -cephale, -cephalian: Pronunciation: /sɛfələs/, /sɛfəloʊ̯/, /sɛfəli:/ /sɛfeɪliːən/. Origin:  (kephalḗ). Meaning: head.
Examples: Sclerocephalus ("hard head"); Euoplocephalus ("well-protected head"), Pachycephalosaurus ("thick headed lizard"), Amtocephale ("Amtgai head"); Therocephalian ("beast-headed")
-ceras, cerat-, -ceratus: Pronunciation: /sɛrəs/, /sɛrət/, /sɛrətəs/. Origin:  (kéras). Meaning: horn. Used for many horned animals, but most notably ceratopsians.
Examples: Stegoceras ("roof horn"); Triceratops ("three-horned face"), Orthoceras ("straight horn") Megaloceras ("big horn") Ceratosaurus ("horned lizard"); Microceratus ("small horned"); rhinoceros ("nose horn"); Albertoceras ("Alberta horn")
cetio-, -cetus: Pronunciation: /sɛtɪoʊ/, /siːtəs/. Origin: Ancient Greek κῆτος (kētos). Meaning: sea-monster. The suffix "-cetus" is used for whales or whale ancestors, while the prefix "cetio-" is used for whale-like or large animals.
Examples: Peregocetus ("Perego whale") Cetiosaurus ("whale lizard"); Ambulocetus ("walking whale"); Pakicetus ("Pakistan whale")
-cheirus: Pronunciation: /kaɪrəs/. Origin:  (kheír). Meaning: hand.
Examples: Deinocheirus ("terrible hand"); Ornithocheirus ("bird hand"); Austrocheirus ("southern hand"); Haplocheirus ("simple hand")
chloro-: Pronunciation: /kloroʊ/. Origin:  (khlōrós). Meaning: green.
Examples: Chlorophyta ("green plant") Chlorophyll ("green leaf")
choer-: Pronunciation: /koɪroʊ/. Origin:  (koíros). Meaning: pig.
Examples: Choeroichthys ("pig-fish"); Choerophryne ("frog pig"); Choerodon ("pig tooth")
coel-: Pronunciation: /siːl/ or /sɛl/ . Origin:  (koîlos). Meaning: hollow.
Examples: coelacanth ("hollow spine"); Coelodonta ("hollow tooth"); Coelophysis ("hollow form") Amphicoelias (¨hollow at both ends¨)
cyan-, cyano-: Pronunciation: /saɪæno/. Origin:  (kuáneos). Meaning: dark blue, blue, dark blue-green.
Examples: Cyanocitta ("blue jay"); Cyanobacteria ("blue bacteria"); Cyanocorax ("blue raven")
cyclo-: Pronunciation: /saɪkloʊ/ (or /saɪklɒ/). Origin:  (kúklos). Meaning: circle.
Examples: Cyclomedusa ("circle Medusa"); Cyclostomata ("circle mouth")
cyn-, -cyon: Pronunciation: /saɪn/, /saɪɒn/. Origin:  (kúon). Meaning: dog. Used for dogs or dog-like creatures.
Examples: Cynodont ("dog tooth"); Cynognathus ("dog jaw"); Cynopterus ("dog wing"); Arctocyon ("bear dog"); Procyonidae ("before the dog");
-dactyl, -dactylus: Pronunciation: /dæktəl/, /dæktələs/. Origin:  (dáktulos). Meaning: finger, toe.
Examples: artiodactyl ("even toe"); Pterodactylus ("wing finger"); perissodactyl ("uneven toe")
 -deres: Origin:  (dére). Meaning: neck, collar.
Examples: Acanthoderes ("spiny neck")
-derm: Pronunciation: /dɜrm/. Origin:  (dérma). Meaning: animal hide. Used for skin.
Examples: placoderm ("plated skin"); echinoderm ("hedgehog skin"); ostracoderm ("shell skin")
-delphys, -delphis, delpho-: Pronunciation: /dɜlfɪs/, /dɜlfʊ/. Origin:  ( delphis). Meaning: womb. Used for therian mammals. 
Examples: Sinodelphys ("Chinese womb"); Didelphis ("two wombs"); Didelphodon ("two-womb [ie opossum] tooth"); Delphinius ("with a womb")
dendro-, -dendron, -dendrum: Pronunciation: /dɛn.dɹoʊ/, /ˈdɛndɹən/, /dɛndɹəm/. Origin:  (déndron). Meaning: tree.
Examples: Rhododendron ("rose tree"); Liriodendron ("lily tree"); Dendrocnide ("tree nettle"); Epidendrum ("above tree") Lepidodendron (¨scaled tree¨)
di-: Pronunciation: /daɪ/. Origin:  (dís). Meaning: twice. Used to indicate two of something.
Examples: Dilophosaurus ("twice crested lizard"); Diceratops ("two-horned face"); diapsid ("two arches")
dino-, deino-: Pronunciation: /daɪnoʊ/. Origin:  (deinós). Meaning: "terrible", "formidable". Used for presumably fearfully large or dangerous animals or animal parts.
Examples: dinosaur ("terrible lizard"), Dinofelis ("terrible cat"), Dinornis ("terrible bird"); Deinonychus ("terrible claw"), Deinocheirus ("terrible hand"); Dinodocus ("terrible beam"); Deinosuchus ("terrible crocodile"), Dinohippus ("terrible horse"), Dinosorex ("terrible shrew") Deinococcus ("terrible grannule")
 diplo-: Pronunciation: /dɪploʊ/, /dɪplo/. Origin:  (diplóos, diploûs). Meaning: double.
Examples: Diplodocus ("double beam"); Diplopoda ("double feet"); Diplomonad ("double unit"); Diplovertebron ("double vertebra")
-don, -, -donto-: see -odon, -odont, -odonto-.
draco-: Pronunciation: /drakoʊs/ Origin:  (drákos). Meaning: dragon.
Examples: Dracophyllum ("dragon race"); Dracocephalum ("dragon head"); Dracaena ("female dragon")
dromaeo-, dromeo-, -dromeus: Pronunciation: /droʊmɪoʊ/, /droʊmɪəs/ Origin:  (dromaîos). Meaning: runner.
Examples: Dromaeosaurus ("runner lizard"); Kulindadromeus ("Kulinda runner"); Thalassodromeus ("sea runner"); Eodromaeus ("dawn runner")
eo-: Pronunciation: /iːoʊ̯/. Origin:  (ēṓs). Meaning: dawn. Used for very early appearances of animals in the fossil record.
Examples: Eohippus ("dawn horse"); Eomaia ("dawn Maia"); Eoraptor ("dawn seizer")
-erpeton: Pronunciation: /ɜrpətɒn/. Origin:  (herpetón). Meaning: reptile (literally, "creeping thing"); used for amphibians.
Examples: Hynerpeton ("Hyner creeper"); Greererpeton ("Greer creeper"); Arizonerpeton ("Arizona creeper"); Albanerpeton ("La Grive Saint Alban creeper")
eu-: Pronunciation: /iːu̟/. Origin:  (eû). Meaning: "good", "well"; also extended via New Latin to mean "true". Used in a variety of ways, often to indicate well-preserved specimens, well-developed bones, "truer" examples of fossil forms, or simply admiration on the part of the discoverer.
Examples: Euparkeria ("Parker's good [animal]") Euhelopus ("good marsh foot") Eustreptospondylus ("true Streptospondylus"); Eucoelophysis ("True Coelophysis")
-felis: Pronunciation: /fiːlɪs/. Origin: . Meaning: cat. "Felis" alone is the genus name for the group that includes the domestic cat.
Examples: Dinofelis ("terrible cat"); Eofelis ("dawn cat"); Pardofelis ("leopard cat")
-form, -formes: Pronunciation: /foʊrm/, /foʊrms/. Origin: . Meaning: shape, form. Used for large groups of animals that share similar characteristics; also used in names of bird and fish orders.
Examples: Galliformes ("chicken form"); Anseriformes ("goose form"); Squaliformes ("shark form")
giga-, giganto-: Pronunciation: /d͡ʒaɪgə/, /d͡ʒaɪgæntoʊ/. Origin:  (gígas, gigantos). Meaning: giant, of a giant, respectively. Used for large species.
Examples: Giganotosaurus ("giant southern lizard"); Gigantopithecus ("giant ape"); Gigantoraptor ("giant seizer"); Gigantopterus ("giant fin")
-gnath-, gnatho-, -gnathus: Pronunciation: /neɪθ/, /neɪθoʊ/, /neɪθəs/ (or /gneɪθəs/). Origin:  (gnáthos). Meaning: jaw.
Examples: Caenagnathasia ("recent Asian jaw"); Gnathostoma ("jaw mouth"); Cynognathus ("dog jaw"); Compsognathus ("elegant jaw"); Gnathosaurus ("jaw lizard")
haplo-: Pronunciation: /hæplə/. Origin:  (haplós-). Meaning: simple.
Examples: Haplorhini ("simple-nosed"); Haplocheirus ("simple hand")
hemi-: Pronunciation: /hɛmi/. Origin:  (hēmi-). Meaning: half.
Examples: Hemicyon ("half-dog"); hemichordate ("half-chordate"); Hemiptera ("half-wing")
hespero-: Pronunciation: /hɛspəroʊ/. Origin:  (hésperos). Meaning: western (originally, "evening").
Examples: Hesperornis ("western bird"); Hesperocyon ("western dog"); Hesperosaurus ("western lizard")
 hippus, hippo-: Pronunciation: /hɪpəs/, /hɪpoʊ/. Origin:  (híppos). Meaning: horse.
Examples: Eohippus ("dawn horse"); Hippodraco ("horse dragon"); Hippopotamus ("river horse")
hyl-, hylo-: Pronunciation: /haɪl/, /haɪloʊ/ (or /haɪlɒ/). Origin:  ("húlē"). Meaning: wood, forest.
Examples: Hylonomus ("forest dweller"); Hylobates ("forest walker"); Hylarana ("forest frog")
-ia: Pronunciation: /iːə/. Origin:  (-ia, -eia). Meaning: an abstraction usually used as an honorific for a person or place.
Examples: Dickinsonia ("for Dickinson"); Cooksonia ("for Cookson"); Coloradia ("for Colorado"); Edmontonia ("for Edmonton"); Thomashuxleya ("for Thomas Huxley")
ichthyo-, -ichthys: Pronunciation: /ɪkθioʊs/, /ɪkθis/. Origin:  (ikhthûs). Meaning: fish. The suffix "-ichthys" is used for fish, while the prefix "ichthyo-", while used for fish, is also used for fish-like creatures.
Examples: Ichthyosaurus ("fish lizard"); Leedsichthys ("Leeds's fish"); Haikouichthys ("Haikou fish"); Ichthyostega ("fish roof")
-lania, Pronunciation: /læniːə/, Origin:  (alaínein): Meaning: to wander. Used for animals that are found in most places around continents.
Examples: Meiolania ("weak wanderer"); Megalania ("great wanderer")
leo-: Pronunciation: /lɛʊ/. Origin:  (léon): Meaning: lion.
Examples: Leopardus ("spotted lion"); Leontopodium ("lion foot"); Leontopithecus ("lion ape")
-lepis, lepido-: Pronunciation: /lɛpɪs/ /lɛpɪdoʊ/ (or /lɛpɪdɒ/). Origin: . Meaning: scale.
Examples: Mongolepis ("Mongol scale"); Stagonolepis ("ornamented scale"); Polymerolepis ("many part scale"); Lepidosauria ("scaled lizards"); Lepidoptera ("scaled wing"); Lepidodendron ("scaled tree")
-lestes: Pronunciation: /lɛstiːz/. Origin: . Meaning: robber.
Examples: Carpolestes ("fruit robber"); Ornitholestes ("bird robber"); Sarcolestes ("flesh robber"); Necrolestes ("grave robber")
long: Pronunciation: /lʊng/. Origin: . Meaning: dragon. Used for dinosaur finds in China.
Examples: Mei long ("sleeping dragon"); Bolong ("small dragon"); Zuolong ("Zuo's dragon"); Shaochilong ("shark toothed dragon")
-lopho-, -lophus: Pronunciation: /lɒfoʊ/, /ləfəs/. Origin: . Meaning: A bird's crest. Used for animals with crests on their heads.
Examples: Dilophosaurus ("two-crested lizard"); Brachylophosaurus ("short-crested lizard"); Saurolophus ("lizard crest")
 lyco-: Pronunciation: /lɪkoʊ/. Origin: . Meaning: wolf.
Examples: Lycopodium ("wolf foot"); Lycodon ("wolf tooth"); Lycoperdon ("wolf fart")
macro-: Pronunciation: /mækroʊ/. Origin:  (makrós). Meaning: (correctly) long; (usually) large.
Examples: macropod ("big foot"); Macrodontophion ("big tooth snake"); Macrogryphosaurus ("big enigmatic lizard")
-maia, maia-: Pronunciation: /meiə/ Origin:  (Maîa). Meaning: Originally the mother of Hermes in Greek mythology and the goddess of growth in Roman mythology, alternatively spelled Maja. Frequently used to indicate maternal roles, this word should not be construed as translating directly to "mother" (Latin māter; Ancient Greek μήτηρ mḗtēr); aside from being a proper name, in Ancient Greek "maîa" can translate to "midwife" or "foster mother" and was used as an honorific address for older women, typically translated into English as "Good Mother".
Examples: Maiasaura ("Good Mother/Maia's lizard"); Eomaia ("dawn Maia"); Juramaia (Jurassic Maia"); Maiacetus ("mother whale")
mega-, megalo-: Pronunciation: /mɛga/, /mɛgaloʊ̯/. Origin:  (mégas, megálē). Meaning: big.
Examples: Megarachne ("big spider"); Megalosaurus ("big lizard"); megalodon ("big tooth")
micro-: Pronunciation: /maɪkroʊ̯/. Origin:  (mikrós). Meaning: "small".
Examples: Microraptor ("small seizer") Microvenator ("small hunter"); Microceratops ("small horned face")
mimo-, -mimus: /maɪmoʊ̯/, /maɪməs/. Origin: . Meaning: actor. Used for creatures that resemble others.
Examples: Struthiomimus; ("ostrich mimic"); Ornithomimus ("bird mimic"); Gallimimus ("chicken mimic"); ornithomimosaur ("bird mimic lizard")
 -monas, -monad: Pronunciation: /moʊnas/, /monas/, /moʊnad/, /monad/. Origin:  (monás). Meaning: unit. Used for single-celled organisms.
Examples: Chlamydomonas ("cloak unit"); Pseudomonas ("false unit"); Metamonad ("encompassing unit")
-morph: Pronunciation: /moʊrf/. Origin:  (morphḗ). Meaning: form, shape. Used for large groups of animals which share a common genetic lineage
Examples: crocodylomorphs ("crocodile form"); sauropodomorphs ("sauropod form"); Muscomorpha ("fly form") Dimorphodon ("two forms of teeth")
-nax, -anax-: Pronunciation: /nax/, /ænax/. Origin:  (ánax). Meaning: king.
Examples: Lythronax ("gore king") Saurophaganax ("king of the lizard-eaters")
-noto-: Pronunciation: /notoʊ/. Origin: . Meaning: south, southern wind. Used for organisms found in the Southern Hemisphere.
Examples: Giganotosaurus ("giant southern lizard"); Notosuchus ("southern crocodile"); Notopalaeognathae ("southern old jaws")
-nych, nycho-, -nyx: see -onych, onycho-, -onyx.
-odon, -odont, -odonto-: Pronunciation: /oʊdɒn/, /oʊdɒnt/, /oʊdɒntoʊ/. Origin:  (odoús). Meaning: tooth. 
Examples: Dimetrodon ("two-measures of teeth"), cynodont ("dog tooth") Carcharodontosaurus ("serrated tooth lizard")
-oides, -odes: Pronunciation: /oiːdiːz/, /oʊːdiːz/. Origin:  (eîdos). Meaning: likeness. Used for species that resemble other species.
Examples: Hypocnemoides ("like Hypocnemis"); Aetobarbakinoides ("like the long-legged buzzard"); Callianthemoides ("like Callianthemum"); Argyrodes ("like silver")
onycho-, -onychus, -onyx: /ɒnikoʊ/, /ɒnikəs/ (or /ɒnaɪkoʊ/, ɒnaɪkəs/), /ɒniks/. Origin:  (ónux). Meaning: claw.
Examples: Deinonychus ("terrible claw"); Euronychodon ("European claw tooth"); Nothronychus ("sloth claw"), Baryonyx ("heavy claw")
ophi-: Pronunciation: /ɒfɪs/. Origin:  (óphis). Meaning: snake. Used for Ophidia or snake-like animals.
Examples: Ophiacodon ("snake tooth"); Ophisaurus ("snake lizard"); Ophiopogon ("snake beard")
-ops: Pronunciation: /ɒps/. Origin:  (óps). Meaning: face.
Examples: Triceratops ("three-horned face"); Lycaenops ("wolf face"); Moschops ("calf face"); Spinops ("spine face")
-ornis, ornith-, ornitho-: Pronunciation: /oʊ̯rnɪs/, /oʊ̯rnɪθ/, /oʊ̯rnɪθoʊ̯/. Origin:  (órnis, órnithos). Meaning: bird, of a bird respectively. "ornith-" and "ornitho-" are generally used for animals with birdlike characteristics; the suffix "-ornis" is generally applied to fossil bird species.
Examples: ornithischian ("bird-hipped"); Ornithocheirus ("bird-hand"); Eoconfuciusornis ("Confucius's dawn bird")
pachy-: Pronunciation: /pæki/ Origin:  (pakhús). Meaning: thick.
Examples: Pachycephalosaurus ("thick-headed lizard"); Pachylemur ("thick lemur"); Pachyuromys ("thick tailed mouse"); Pachydermata ("thick skin")
para-: Pronunciation: /pærɑː/ Origin:  (pará). Meaning: near. Used for species that resemble previously named species.
Examples: Paranthodon ("near Anthodon"); Pararhabdodon ("near Rhabdodon"); Parasaurolophus ("near Saurolophus)"
 -pelta: Pronunciation: /pɛltə:/ Origin:  (péltē). Meaning: shield. Frequently used for ankylosaurs.
Examples: Sauropelta ("lizard shield"); Dracopelta ("dragon shield"); Cedarpelta ("Cedar shield")
-philus, -phila, philo-: Pronunciation: /fiːləs/, /fiːlə/, /fiːloʊ/. Origin:  (phílos). Meaning: dear, beloved, loving. Used for organisms perceived as having a fondness for a particular thing.
Examples: Sarcophilus ("flesh-loving"); Drosophila ("dew-loving"); Anthophila ("flower-loving"); Philodendron ("loving trees")
-phyton, -phyta, phyto-, -phyte: Pronunciation: /faɪtən/, /faitə/, /faɪtoʊ/, /faɪt/. Origin:  (phutón). Meaning: plant.
Examples: Spermatophyta ("seed plant"); Rhyniophyte ("Rhynie plant"); Phytophthora ("plant destroyer"); Phytolacca ("plant lac")
-pithecus, pitheco-: Pronunciation: /piθəkəs/, /piθəkoʊ/, //piθəkə/. Origin:  (píthēkos). Meaning: ape, monkey.
Examples: Australopithecus ("southern ape"); Ardipithecus ("floor ape"); Gigantopithecus ("giant ape"); Pithecellobium ("monkey earring")
platy-: Pronunciation: /ˈplætɪ/. Origin: Ancient Greek πλατύς (platús). Meaning: flat. Used for creatures that are flat or have flat parts.
Examples: Platyhelminthes ("flat worm"); Platybelodon ("flat spear-tusk"); Platycodon ("flat bell"); platypus ("flat foot)
plesio-, plesi-: Pronunciation: /pliːziːoʊ/, /pliːz/ (or pliːʒ/). Origin: Ancient Greek πλησίον (plēsíon). Meaning: near. Used for species that bear similarities to other species.
Examples: Plesiosaurus ("near lizard"); Plesiorycteropus ("near aardvark"); Plesiobaena ("near Baena"); Plesiadapis ("near Adapis")
-pod, podo-, -pus: Pronunciation: /pɒd/, /pɒdoʊ/, /pʊs/. Origin: Ancient Greek πούς, ποδός (poús, podós). Meaning: foot, of the foot, respectively.
Examples: Ornithopod ("bird foot"); Brachypodosaurus ("short footed lizard"); Moropus ("slow foot")
pro-, protero-: pronunciation: /proʊ̯/, /proʊ̯tεroʊ̯/. Origin: Ancient Greek πρό, πρότερος (pró, próteros). Meaning: before. Usually used for ancestral forms.
Examples:Proterosuchus ("before crocodile"); Procompsognathus ("before elegant jaw"); Prosaurolophus ("before lizard crest")
proto-: Pronunciation: /proʊtoʊ/. Origin: Ancient Greek πρῶτος (prōtos). Meaning: first. Used for early appearances in the fossil record.
Examples: Protoceratops ("first horned face"); Protognathosaurus ("first jaw lizard"); Protohadros ("first hadrosaur")
psittaco-, -psitta: Pronunciation: /sitɑːkoʊ/, /psitə/. Origin: Ancient Greek ψιττακός (psittakós). Meaning: parrot. "Psittaco-" is used for parrot-like creatures, while the suffix "psitta" is used for parrots.
Examples: Psittacosaurus ("parrot lizard"); Cyclopsitta ("Cyclops parrot"); Xenopsitta ("strange parrot").
pter-, ptero-, -pterus, pteryg-, -ptera, -pteryx. Pronunciation: /ter/, /teroʊ/, /pterəs/, /terɪg/, /pterɪx/. Origin: Ancient Greek πτέρυξ, πτέρυγος (pterux, ptérugos). Meaning: wing, of a wing, respectively. Used for many winged creatures, but also expanded to mean "fin", and used for many undersea arthropods. The suffix "-ptera" is also used in orders of winged insects.
Examples: Pteranodon ("toothless wing"); Pterodactylus ("winged finger"); Eurypterus ("wide wing" or fin); Pterygotus ("winged" or finned); Coleoptera ("sheathed wing"); Archaeopteryx ("ancient wing"); Stenopterygius ("narrow finned")
-pus: see -pod, -podo-, -pus.
-raptor, raptor-: Pronunciation: /ræptər/. Origin: Latin raptor. Meaning: "robber, thief". Frequently used for dromaeosaurids or similar animals. The term "raptor" by itself may also be used for a dromeosaurid, a Velociraptor, or originally, a bird of prey.
Examples: Velociraptor ("swift robber"); Utahraptor ("Utah robber"); Raptorex ("thief king")
-rex: Pronunciation: /rεks/. Origin: Latin rex. Meaning: king. Often used for large or impressive animals.
Examples: Raptorex ("thief king"); Dracorex ("dragon king"); Tyrannosaurus rex ("tyrant lizard king")
 -rhina, rhino-, -rhinus: Pronunciation: /raɪnə/ /raɪnoʊ̯/, /raɪnəs/. Origin: Ancient Greek ῥίς (rhís). Meaning: nose.
Examples: Altirhinus ("high nose"); Pachyrhinosaurus ("thick-nosed lizard"); Lycorhinus ("wolf nose"); Arrhinoceratops ("noseless horned face"); Cretoxyrhina ("Cretaceous sharp nose"); rhinoceros ("nose horn")
 rhodo-: Pronunciation: /roʊdoʊ/, /rodoʊ/. Origin: Ancient Greek ῥόδον (rhódon). Meaning: "rose". Used for red-colored or otherwise rose-like organisms.
Examples: Rhododendron ("rose tree"); Rhodophyta ("rose plant"); Rhodomonas ("rose unit")
rhynco-, -rhynchus: Pronunciation: /rɪnkoʊ/, /rɪnkəs/. Origin: Ancient Greek ῥύγχος (rhúgkhos). Meaning: "beak", "snout".
Examples: Rhamphorhynchus ("prow beak"); Aspidorhynchus ( "shield snout"); Ornithorhynchus ("bird beak"); rhynchosaur ("beaked lizard")
sarco-: Pronunciation: /sɑːrkʊ/. Origin: Ancient Greek σάρξ (sárx). Meaning: flesh. Used for flesh-eating animals or animals and plants with fleshy parts
Examples: Sarcophilus ("flesh-loving"); Sarcopterygii ("fleshy fin"); Sarcosuchus ("flesh crocodile")
saur, sauro-, -saurus: Pronunciation: /sɔər/, /sɔəroʊ/, /sɔərəs/. Origin: Ancient Greek . Meaning: lizard. Used for dinosaurs and other extinct reptiles.
Examples: Dinosaur ("terrible lizard") Mosasaur ("Meuse lizard"), Tyrannosaurus ("tyrant lizard"), Allosaurus ("different lizard"), Sauroposeidon ("Poseidon lizard")
sino-: Pronunciation; /saɪnoʊ̯/. Origin: . Meaning: from China. Used for ancient and other civilizations.
Examples: Sinornithosaurus; ("Chinese bird-lizard"); Sinosauropteryx ("Chinese lizard wing"); Sinoceratops ("Chinese horned face")
smilo-, -smilus: Pronunciation: /smaɪloʊ/, /smaɪləs/. Origin: Ancient Greek σμίλη. Meaning: a carving knife or chisel. Used for animals with sabre teeth.
Examples: Smilodon ("knife tooth"); Smilosuchus ("knife crocodile"); Thylacosmilus ("pouched knife"); Xenosmilus ("strange knife")
-spondylus: Pronunciation: /spɒndələs/. Origin: Ancient Greek σπόνδυλος. Meaning: vertebra.
Examples: Streptospondylus ("backwards vertebra"); Massospondylus ("longer vertebra"); Bothriospondylus ("excavated vertebra")
squali-, squalo-: Pronunciation: /skweɪlɪ/, /skweɪloʊ/ . Origin: Latin squalus. Meaning: a kind of sea fish. Used for shark like creatures.
Examples: Squalodon ("shark tooth") Squaliformes ("shark form"); Squalicorax ("shark raven") Squalomorphii ("shark shape")
stego-, -stega: Pronunciation: /stɛgoʊ/, /stɛgə/. Origin: Ancient Greek στέγη. Meaning: roof. Used for armoured or plated animals.
Examples: Stegosaurus ("roofed lizard"); Ichthyostega ("roofed fish"); Acanthostega ("spine roof")
strepto-: Pronunciation: /streptoʊ/, /strepto/. Origin: Ancient Greek στρεπτός. Meaning: twisted, bent.
Examples: Streptophyta ("bent plant"); Streptococcus ("twisted granule"); Streptospondylus ("twisted vertebra")
-stoma, -stome, -stomus: Pronunciation: /stoʊma/, /stoʊm/, /stoʊməs/. Origin: Ancient Greek στόμα (stóma). Meaning: mouth.
Examples: deuterostome (second mouth); Gnathostoma ("jaw mouth") Anastomus ("on mouth")
sucho-, -suchus: Pronunciation: /sjuːkoʊ/, /sjuːkəs/. Origin: Ancient Greek σοῦχος (soûkhos). Meaning:: Originally the Ancient Greek name for the Ancient Egyptian crocodile-headed god, Sobek. Used to denote crocodilians or crocodile-like animals.
Examples: Deinosuchus ("terrible crocodile") Anatosuchus ("duck crocodile"), Suchomimus ("crocodile mimic")
tauro-: /taərəs/. Origin: . Meaning: bull.
Examples: Taurotragus ("male goat-bull"); Taurovenator ("bull hunter"); Carnotaurus ("flesh bull")
-teuthis: Pronunciation: /tjuːθɪs/. Origin: Ancient Greek τευθίς (teuthís). Meaning: squid. Used for squids and similar cephalopods.
Examples: Gonioteuthis ("narrow squid") Architeuthis ("ruling squid") Vampyroteuthis ("vampire squid"); Cylindroteuthis ("cylindrical squid")
thero-, -therium. Pronunciation: /θɛroʊ/, /θiːrɪəm/. Origin: Ancient Greek θήρ (thḗr). Meaning: beast. Used for supposedly monstrous animals. The suffix "-therium" is often used to denote extinct mammals.
Examples: theropod ("beast foot"), Deinotherium ("terrible beast") Megatherium ("big beast") Brontotherium ("thunder beast"); Uintatherium ("beast of the Uinta mountains")
thylac-: Pronunciation: /θaɪlæk/. Origin: Ancient Greek θύλακος (thúlakos). Meaning: a sack. In the sense of "pouch", used for marsupials.
Examples: Thylacine ("pouched one"); Thylacoleo ("pouched lion"); Thylacosmilus ("pouched knife")
tri-: Pronunciation: /traɪ/. Origin: Ancient Greek τρία (tría). Meaning: three.
Examples: Triceratops ("three-horned face"); Triconodon ("three coned teeth"); trilobite ("three lobes")
titano-, -titan: Pronunciation: /taɪtænoʊ/, /taɪtən/. Origin: Ancient Greek Τιτάν, Τιτᾶνος (Titán, Titânos). Meaning: Titan, of the Titan, respectively. Used for large animals.
Examples: Titanosaurus ("Titan lizard"); Giraffatitan ("giraffe Titan"); Anatotitan ("duck Titan"); Titanotherium ("Titan beast"); Titanoboa ("Titanic boa")
tyranno-, -tyrannus: Pronunciation: /taɪrænoʊ/, /taɪrænəs/. Origin: Ancient Greek τύραννος (túrannos). Meaning: tyrant. Used for animals similar to Tyrannosaurus.
Examples: Zhuchengtyrannus ("Zhucheng tyrant"); Tyrannosaurus ("tyrant lizard"); Nanotyrannus ("dwarf tyrant"); Tyrannotitan ("Titanic tyrant"); Sinotyrannus ("Chinese tyrant"); Suskityrannus ("coyote tyrant")
-urus, -uro-: Pronunciation: /uːrəs/, /uːroʊ/. Origin:  (ourá). Meaning: tail.
Examples: Dasyurus ("hairy tail"); Coelurosauria ("hollow tail lizards"); Uromastyx ("tail scourge")
veloci-: Pronunciation: /vəlɑsɪ/. Origin: Latin velox. Meaning: speed.
Example: Velociraptor ("quick thief"); Velocisaurus ("swift lizard")
-venator: Pronunciation: /vɛnətər/. Origin: Latin venator. Meaning: hunter.
Examples: Afrovenator ("African hunter"); Juravenator ("Jura hunter"); Scorpiovenator ("scorpion hunter"); Neovenator ("new hunter"); Concavenator ("Cuenca hunter")
xeno-: Pronunciation: /zinoʊ/. Origin: Ancient Greek ξένος (xénos). Meaning: strange, stranger. Used for organisms that exhibit unusual traits for their class.
Examples: Xenosmilus ("strange knife"); Xenotarsosaurus ("strange ankled lizard"); Xenopsitta ("strange parrot"); Xenocyon ("strange dog"); Xenokeryx ("strange horn"); Xenostega ("strange roof"); Xenohyla ("strange hynadae"); Xenozancla ("strange animal"); Xenodermus ("strange skin")
-zoon, -zoa: Pronunciation: /zoʊɑːn/, /zoʊə/. Origin: Ancient Greek ζῷον (zōion). Meaning: animal. Used for broad categories of animals, or in certain names of animals.
Examples: Metazoa ("encompassing animals"); Parazoa ("near animals"); Ecdysozoa ("moulting animals"); Yunnanozoon ("animal from Yunnan"); Yuyuanozoon ("animal from Yu Yuan")

See also 
List of Latin and Greek words commonly used in systematic names
List of Greek and Latin roots in English
List of Latin words with English derivatives
List of medical roots, suffixes and prefixes
Latin names of cities

Lists of prehistoric animal genera (alphabetic)
Taxonomic affixes